L'Opinion is a French language daily newspaper based in Paris, France, which has been in circulation since 2013.

History and profile
L'Opinion was first published on 15 May 2013. The website, launched on 14 May 2013, hosts all the print issues available in digital format. The founder of the paper is Nicolas Beytout who served as the editor of Le Figaro and Les Échos. L'Opinion was modelled on the Italian daily Il Foglio and American political publication Politico.

L'Opinion is published by  Bey Medias Presse and Internet.

L'Opinion is headquartered in Paris and is published in Berliner format. The paper defines itself as a liberal, pro-business, and pro-European publication. Luc de Barochez is the editor-in-chief of the online version of the paper which is behind a paywall.

See also
 List of newspapers in France

References

External links
 Official website

2013 establishments in France
Classical liberalism
Daily newspapers published in France
Liberal media in France
Newspapers established in 2013
Newspapers published in Paris
Pro-Europeanism